Jamshila is a census town in Sonbhadra district in the Indian state of Uttar Pradesh.

Demographics
 India census, Jamshila had a population of 10,270. Males constitute 55% of the population and females 45%. Jamshila has an average literacy rate of 74%, higher than the national average of 59.5%: male literacy is 82%, and female literacy is 65%. In Jamshila, 11% of the population is under 6 years of age.

References

Cities and towns in Sonbhadra district